Angie Phillips is a British meteorologist for BBC Newsline. She trained at the Met Office's College in Reading, Berkshire and joined the service in 1985. Phillips' first job in forecasting was at the Belfast Climate Office.  Later, while working at the Met Office in Aldergrove, she became part of the ITN weather team.  In 1995 she was transferred to BBC Northern Ireland. She is married with three children. Phillips participated in conservationism activities at the Woodland Trust.

References and further reading

 
 
 
 

BBC weather forecasters
Living people
British meteorologists
Scientists from Belfast
Year of birth missing (living people)